Midnight Monster Hop is a horror host television show that first aired in 2006 on HSTV in Uniontown, Pennsylvania.

In February 2008, the show began airing on WPXI/RTN Pittsburgh, and as of May 23, 2009 became available nationwide on select Retro Television Network affiliates, showing cult and B horror films with introductions, jokes, and skits inserted between movie segments. The Show was pulled off Retro Television by Ricky, after a contract dispute, so it lost its national reach, though many local RTV affiliates still run MMH instead of other shows that RTV picked up. A good example was WXYZ-TV's RTV subchannel, which aired it due to WMYD-TV being the originating station of Wolfman Mac's Chiller Drive-In, which RTV picked up for national broadcast.

Midnight Monster Hop may still be seen on many independent stations around the country.

Cast
Featured cast members include:
Gravely MacCabre (Ricky Dick) - Show Host
Grizelda MacCabre (Karen Schnaubelt Turner Dick) - Co-Host 
Skully MacCabre (Caitlin Dick) - Daughter
Whiplash (Sarah Black) Malevolent Vampire
Deliria (Heather Curtis) House Zombie
Prof Scrye (Chris Handa) Occult Cultural Anthropologist
Uncle Vlad (Marty Gear) Joke Telling Vampire
Vapor (Ame Matay) Dead Bride
Madam Spooky (Dusti Lewars) Musicologist Vampire

Featured Movies
Some of the horror movies featured in Midnight Monster Hop include:
Revolt of the Zombies
Countess Dracula
House on Haunted Hill

Awards
Midnight Monster Hop was nominated for a Rondo Hatton Classic Horror Awards (aka a "Rondo Award") in 2008, 2009, and 2010.

Production
Midnight monster hop was filmed on location at the old location of Castle Blood in Beallsville, PA. All post-2011 content is now filmed at the new Castle Blood in Monessen, PA. Midnight Monster Hop is a combination of traditional horror hosting and a celebration of all things Halloween. The show features the music of King Dapper Combo and ends each episode with the tag line, "It's Midnight Somewhere!"

In the media
Beallsville couple stars in TV show
Castle Blood brings back scary, late-night fun to local TV
An Interview With Ricky Dick

References

External links
 Official website
 Show listing on E-Gor's Chamber of TV Horror Hosts
 Horror Host Graveyard listing

Midnight movie television series
2009 American television series debuts